Worlington Golf Links Halt railway station was a railway station on the Cambridge to Mildenhall railway. It served the village of Worlington, Suffolk, England, and closed in 1962.

References

External links
 Worlington Golf Links Halt station on navigable 1946 O. S. map
 Worlington Golf Links Halt at Disused Stations

Disused railway stations in Suffolk
Former Great Eastern Railway stations
Railway stations in Great Britain opened in 1922
Railway stations in Great Britain closed in 1962
Worlington, Suffolk